Reverb.com is an online marketplace for new, used, and vintage musical equipment. It was founded in 2013 by David Kalt, shortly after he purchased the musical instrument store Chicago Music Exchange and became frustrated with then-available options for buying and selling guitars online. It has grown into a multimillion-dollar business with more than 10 million monthly visitors and $47 million in funding.

It allows anyone to create free listings for musical instruments and other related equipment. It has also sold equipment from popular artists such as Maroon 5, Wilco, Green Day, Billy Corgan and Ray Lamontagne.

To help users determine market values for instruments, Reverb.com has a price guide of real-time transactional data. It offers iPhone and Android apps that include the site's main features, and as of 2017 has on-the-ground support in the UK, The Netherlands, Australia, Germany, France and Japan. In late 2017, it launched Reverb LP, an online marketplace for LPs and other physical music; and the Reverb Foundation, with non-profit supporting programs and initiatives to increase access to music education, equipment, and playing opportunities.

In August 2019, Reverb.com was acquired by Etsy for $275 million.

History

Funding
In November 2013, Reverb secured $2.3 million in funding from investors including Cheap Trick's Rick Nielsen, Lightbank co-founders Brad Keywell and Eric Lefkofsky, David Lowery of Cracker and Camper van Beethoven, Silicon Valley entrepreneur Eric Ries, and country music star Brad Paisley. The company raised another $4.2 million in January 2015 before announcing an additional $25 million led by global growth equity investor Summit Partners in December of the same year.

In August 2017, the company announced another $15 million in funding from 65 investors, including PayPal co-founder Max Levchin, Silicon Valley investor Roger McNamee, former Twitter COO Adam Bain, and Jon Oringer, CEO of Shutterstock, who said, “As a regular user of Reverb.com, I am witnessing first-hand the positive impact that the company is having on musicians and the way instruments are bought and sold. I’m excited to support not only a successful marketplace—as that business model has proven itself powerful—but a company that’s uplifting an entire industry.”

Including seed funding, the latest round brings Reverb's total funding to $47 million.

Growth and international expansion
In August 2017, Reverb was named No. 18 on the Inc 5000 list of fastest-growing private companies, with 12,327 percent three-year growth (2013–2016.) In 2016, the company generated $16 million in revenue and supported $240 million in sales of new and used equipment through its platform. As of December 2017, the company anticipated closing out the year with close to $400 million in sales. In August 2016, Reverb hired its first on-the-ground employees in the UK, France, and Australia. In the same month, the company launched its mobile app outside of North America. Within a year of its expansion into Europe, the company grew its users in the region by 700 percent and its sales in the region by 300 percent. As of 2017, the company has additional team members in Germany and Japan.

Acquisition by Etsy 
On August 15, 2019, Etsy completed the acquisition of Reverb.com for $275 million in cash, subject to certain adjustments with respect to cash, working capital, transaction expenses, and the value of equity awards granted in connection with the transaction.

Josh Silverman, Chief Executive Officer of Etsy, commented, "We are excited to officially welcome Reverb's employees and the entire Reverb community to Etsy. We see significant potential in the Reverb marketplace and look forward to supporting them as they enable more and more music lovers around the world to buy, sell, connect, and learn. It is our goal to unlock further value in what is already a strong and vibrant business with key competitive differentiation."

Business model
Reverb charges a commission fee to the seller and a small percent for credit card processing. Kalt said, “When we started Reverb.com, musicians were getting 50¢ on the dollar when they sold something and paying 100¢ on the dollar when they bought something. By cutting fees and offering more information about comparable sales, we've narrowed that gap—and gotten millions more instruments on sale."

Another factor in the company's success is that roughly 85 percent of employees are musicians. Dave Depper, touring guitarist for Death Cab for Cutie, said, "My experience has been 100 percent positive. You can just tell it's run by people who are musicians or who care about musicians' experience." Depper also cited the website's community feel as a positive, and that he is able to buy an instrument before a tour and sell it for about the same price after.

The company also provides informative content such as demo videos and how-to articles to drive traffic to the website.

Artist Shops
In addition to shops from individuals and dealers, Reverb has hosted sales for a number of notable artists, including: 
 Billy Corgan of Smashing Pumpkins
 Bill Ward of Black Sabbath
 Nils Lofgren of the E Street Band
 Wilco
 Ray Lamontagne
 Jimmy Chamberlin of the Smashing Pumpkins
 Steve Albini (sold mics from Nirvana's “In Utero”)
 J Mascis of Dinosaur Jr.
 Steve Vai
 Mike Gordon of Phish
 Alessandro Cortini of Nine Inch Nails
Brent Hinds of Mastodon

External links
 David Kalt Interview NAMM Oral History Library (2018)

References

Internet properties established in 2013
Online marketplaces of the United States
2019 mergers and acquisitions